Jennifer Missoni (born April 3, 1985) is an Italian actress known for such films and television shows as Playback, Gossip Girl, Law & Order: Criminal Intent and Inferno: A Linda Lovelace Story.

Missoni attended Idyllwild Arts Academy. She is the granddaughter of Ottavio Missoni, founder of the fashion company Missoni.

Filmography

Film

Television

References

External links

Living people
Italian film actresses
Italian television actresses
1985 births
21st-century Italian actresses
Italian expatriates in the United States